Muhamet Dibra (31 October 1923 – 1 January 1998) was an Albanian football player. The road the Loro Boriçi Stadium is on in Shkodër is named after him and he received a number of notable awards for his services to sport in Albania.

Club career
He played for Vllaznia Shkodër and Partizani Tirana and won three National Championships in 1945, 1946 and 1948.

International career
He was also a member of the Albania national team between 1946 and 1953, where he earned 19 caps and also won the 1946 Balkan Cup.

Honours
Albanian Superliga: 3
 1945, 1946, 1948

References

External links

1923 births
1998 deaths
Footballers from Shkodër
Albanian footballers
Association football defenders
Albania international footballers
KF Vllaznia Shkodër players
FK Partizani Tirana players